The 2013 Scottish Open Grand Prix was the sixteenth grand prix gold and grand prix tournament of the 2013 BWF Grand Prix Gold and Grand Prix. The tournament was held in Emirates Arena, Glasgow, Scotland November 20–24, 2013 and had a total purse of $50,000.

Men's singles

Seeds

  Ville Lang (semi-final)
  Henri Hurskainen (final)
  Brice Leverdez (champion)
  Ramdan Misbun (first round)
  Sattawat Pongnairat (first round)
  Dmytro Zavadsky (quarter-final)
  Scott Evans (second round)
  Andre Kurniawan Tedjono (semi-final)
  Joachim Persson (third round)
  Petr Koukal (first round)
  Lucas Corvee (third round)
  Eetu Heino (third round)
  Christian Lind Thomsen (third round)
  Kieran Merrilees (third round)
  Thomas Rouxel (quarter-final)
  Raul Must (third round)

Finals

Top half

Section 1

Section 2

Section 3

Section 4

Bottom half

Section 5

Section 6

Section 7

Section 8

Women's singles

Seeds

  Carolina Marin (champion)
  Kirsty Gilmour (final)
  Petya Nedelcheva (second round)
  Beatriz Corrales (semi-final)
  Kristina Gavnholt (quarter-final)
  Sashina Vignes Waran (quarter-final)
  Linda Zechiri (quarter-final)
  Jamie Subandhi (first round)

Finals

Top half

Section 1

Section 2

Bottom half

Section 3

Section 4

Men's doubles

Seeds

  Chris Langridge / Peter Mills (quarter-final)
  Lukasz Moren / Wojciech Szkudlarczyk (second round)
  Adam Cwalina / Przemyslaw Wacha (semi-final)
  Marcus Ellis /  Paul Van Rietvelde (withdrew)
  Mads Conrad-Petersen / Mads Pieler Kolding (champion)
  Anders Skaarup Rasmussen / Kim Astrup Sorensen (final)
  Jacco Arends / Jelle Maas (quarter-final)
  Phillip Chew / Sattawat Pongnairat (first round)

Finals

Top half

Section 1

Section 2

Bottom half

Section 3

Section 4

Women's doubles

Seeds

  Imogen Bankier /  Petya Nedelcheva (semi-final)
  Jillie Cooper / Kirsty Gilmour (second round)
  Heather Olver / Kate Robertshaw (quarter-final)
  Ng Hui Ern / Ng Hui Lin (final)

Finals

Top half

Section 1

Section 2

Bottom half

Section 3

Section 4

Mixed doubles

Seeds

  Chris Langridge / Heather Olver (final)
  Phillip Chew / Jamie Subandhi (second round)
  Anders Skaarup Rasmussen / Lena Grebak (quarter-final)
  Nico Ruponen / Amanda Hogstrom (second round)
  Robert Blair / Imogen Bankier (champion)
  Jacco Arends / Selena Piek (semi-final)
  Sam Magee / Chloe Magee (quarter-final)
  Ross Smith / Renuga Veeran (second round)

Finals

Top half

Section 1

Section 2

Bottom half

Section 3

Section 4

References

2013 in Scottish sport
International sports competitions in Glasgow
Scotland Open Grand Prix
Scotland Open Grand Prix
Scottish Open (badminton)